Cost of Living is the second studio album by American band Downtown Boys. It was released in August 2017 under Sub Pop Records.

Tracklisting

References

2017 albums
Sub Pop albums
Downtown Boys (band) albums